Wisconsin is the second album by the hardcore punk band The Crucifucks. The album is noted for having a more "mellow" sound compared to The Crucifucks debut, although its lyrics maintain a stridently anarchist political viewpoint.

Track listing

 "Intro"
 "The Mountain Song"
 "Washington"
 "Resurrection"
 "Earth by Invitation Only"
 "Laws Against Laughing"
 "Pig in a Blanket"
 "When the Top Comes Off"
 "Concession Stand"
 "Wisconsin"
 "Artificial Competition"
 "Holiday Parade"
 "The Savior"

References

The Crucifucks albums
1987 albums
Alternative Tentacles albums